The city of Ottawa, Canada held municipal elections on January 2, 1922 to elect members of the 1922 Ottawa City Council.

Mayor of Ottawa

Plebiscites

Ottawa Board of Control
(4 elected)

Ottawa City Council
(2 elected from each ward)

References
The Ottawa Evening Citizen, Jan 3, 1922

Municipal elections in Ottawa
1922 elections in Canada
1920s in Ottawa
1922 in Ontario